Luis Ángel Cereceda Parra, known as Ángel Parra (27 June 1943 – 11 March 2017), was a Chilean singer and songwriter, son of  Violeta Parra and Luis Cereceda Arenas, brother of Isabel Parra. His main civil surname was Cereceda, but he performed under his maternal surname Parra. He traveled abroad helping to maintain the Nueva Canción tradition in Chilean expatriate communities in Europe, North America, and Australia. His son Ángel Cereceda Orrego, also known as Ángel Parra, was the lead guitarist for the band Los Tres.

Parra died of lung cancer in Paris, France, on 11 March 2017, aged 73.

See also
Parra family

References 

 

1943 births
2017 deaths
20th-century Chilean male singers
Chilean folk singers
Chilean singer-songwriters
Musicians from Valparaíso
Singers from Valparaíso
Ángel Parra
Nueva canción
Deaths from lung cancer in France
20th-century Chilean male artists